Dusty May (born December 30, 1976) is an American college basketball coach.  He is the head men's basketball coach at Florida Atlantic University.

Coaching career
After graduating from Eastern Greene High School in 1995, May served as a student manager at Indiana under Bob Knight as an undergraduate from 1996 to 2000. After graduation, he had video and administrative roles with both USC and Indiana before landing his first assistant coaching job at Eastern Michigan, where he was on staff for the 2005–2006 season. May then had subsequent stops at Murray State, and UAB, where he served under former Indiana head coach Mike Davis. He joined the staff at Louisiana Tech where he was an assistant under both Kerry Rupp and Mike White. 

May followed White to take an assistant coaching job at Florida, where he served from 2015 to 2018 before being named the head coach at Florida Atlantic on March 22, 2018 replacing Michael Curry.

Head coaching record

References

External links
 Florida Atlantic profile

Year of birth missing (living people)
Living people
American men's basketball coaches
Basketball coaches from Indiana
College men's basketball head coaches in the United States
Eastern Michigan Eagles men's basketball coaches
Florida Atlantic Owls men's basketball coaches
Florida Gators men's basketball coaches
Louisiana Tech Bulldogs basketball coaches
Murray State Racers men's basketball coaches
UAB Blazers men's basketball coaches